A Dream of Happiness (German:Ein Traum vom Glück) is a 1924 German silent film directed by Paul L. Stein and starring Harry Liedtke, Ferdinand von Alten and Uschi Elleot.

Cast
 Harry Liedtke 
 Ferdinand von Alten 
 Uschi Elleot 
 Agnes Esterhazy 
 Fritz Kampers 
 Harry Hardt 
 Camilla von Hollay 
 Claire Rommer 
 Max Kronert 
 Hans Junkermann 
 Jakob Tiedtke

References

External links

1924 films
Films of the Weimar Republic
Films directed by Paul L. Stein
German silent feature films
German black-and-white films